Swiss Solidarity (in French: La Chaîne du bonheur, in German: Glückskette, in Italian: La Catena della Solidarietà, in Rhaeto-Romance: Chadaina da Fortuna) is a Swiss nonprofit organization for charitable, social, and humanitarian aid campaigns.

Description

Swiss Solidarity is a foundation that raises funds for humanitarian relief projects and works with the SRG SSR (Swiss Broadcasting Corporation) and 25 Swiss relief organizations to this end. Swiss Solidarity is thus able to benefit from the specific support of public broadcasting services. It also collaborates with the private media.  

The foundation does not simply distribute cash but finances relief projects run by experienced Swiss relief organizations. These involve emergency and rehabilitation aid as well as sustainable rebuilding work.

Activities
Fund-raising: Swiss Solidarity raises funds by means of appeals in the media and on the Internet.
Distribution: Swiss Solidarity uses the funds entrusted to it to finance relief projects which are planned and carried out by 25 accredited partner relief organizations (2012).
Monitoring: Swiss Solidarity monitors the financing and carrying out of projects using recognized and respected criteria. It ensures that its aid is neither exploited nor abused by any party.
Information: Swiss Solidarity provides the public with information on the precise use of donations.

History

Swiss Solidarity was created immediately after World War II as a Radio Sottens programme and was first broadcast on 26 September 1946. One year later the idea had already been taken up by the Italian- and German-speaking regions of Switzerland.

The form of the appeals underwent continual change, from requesting minor assistance for private persons to Europe-wide appeals for major relief campaigns. Swiss Solidarity became an independent foundation in 1983. Since it was founded over 60 years ago, Swiss Solidarity has received donations of approximately 900 million Swiss francs from 115 fundraising campaigns and fund-raising days.

Disaster relief

Swiss Solidarity considers a disaster or crisis to be a major event affecting a large number of people; the resulting damage is so great that victims of the disaster no longer have the power to help themselves.
On average, Swiss Solidarity finances relief campaigns with
15% for immediate and emergency aid,
70% for repair and rebuilding work,
15% for sustainable development.

References

External links
 Official Website of Swiss Solidarity

Charity fundraisers
Foundations based in Switzerland
Non-profit organisations based in Switzerland
Human rights organisations based in Switzerland